Jorge Pina Roldán (born 28 February 1983 in Zaragoza, Aragon) is a Spanish former professional footballer who played as a left winger.

Honours
Spain U19
UEFA European Under-19 Championship: 2002

Spain U20
FIFA U-20 World Cup runner-up: 2003

References

External links

1983 births
Living people
Footballers from Zaragoza
Spanish footballers
Association football wingers
La Liga players
Segunda División players
Segunda División B players
Tercera División players
Real Zaragoza B players
Racing de Ferrol footballers
Atlético Malagueño players
Málaga CF players
UD Salamanca players
Sporting de Gijón players
Levante UD footballers
Albacete Balompié players
CF Villanovense players
CD Ebro players
CD El Palo players
Football League (Greece) players
Athlitiki Enosi Larissa F.C. players
Gibraltar Premier Division players
Europa F.C. players
Spain youth international footballers
Spain under-21 international footballers
Spanish expatriate footballers
Expatriate footballers in Greece
Expatriate footballers in Norway
Expatriate footballers in Gibraltar
Spanish expatriate sportspeople in Greece
Spanish expatriate sportspeople in Norway
Spanish expatriate sportspeople in Gibraltar